was a  after Bunpō and before Genkō. This period spanned the period from April 1319 through February 1321.

Change of era
 1319 : The new era name was created to mark the accession of Emperor Go-Daigo and the beginning of his reign. The previous era ended and the new one commenced in Bunpō 3. The era name was taken from the Old Book of Tang.

Events of the Gen'ō era
After the abdication of Emperor Hanazono in Bunpō 2, Takaharu-shinno was proclaimed emperor at the age of 31. Nijō Michihira was kampaku (chancellor); but the court remained under the direction of former-Emperor Go-Uda. Prince Morikuni  was the shōgun in Kamakura; and the daimyō of Sagami, Hōjō Takatoki, was shikken or chief minister of the shogunate.
 1319 (Gen'ō 1', 3rd month): Prince Kuniyoshi, the son of former-Emperor Go-Nijō, was declared Crown Prince (tōgu).
 1319 (Gen'ō 1, 6th month): The sadaijin (minister of the left), Konoe Tsunehira, died.
 1319 (Gen'ō 1, in the 8th month): The emperor took Kishi, the daughter of Saionji Sanekane, as one of his concubines; and she became a favorite. In addition, he had many concubines, which meant that he had many sons and daughters.
 1319 (Gen'ō 1, 12th month): Nijō Michihira was obliged to resign his position as kampaku because of pressure from the bakufu in Kamakura; and Ichijō Uchitsune became kampaku instead.
 1330 (Gen'ō 2, 5th month): Hōjō Tokiasu, the kanrei in Kyoto, died at Rokuhara mansion, which was the stronghold of the Kamakura shogunate in the capital. Tokiasu's shogunate position was also known as Rokuhara Tandai and Kitakata.
 1320 (Gen'ō 2, 5th month): The former regent, Kujō Moronori died at age 48.

Notes

References
 Nussbaum, Louis-Frédéric and Käthe Roth. (2005).  Japan encyclopedia. Cambridge: Harvard University Press. ;  OCLC 58053128
 Titsingh, Isaac. (1834). Nihon Ōdai Ichiran; ou,  Annales des empereurs du Japon.  Paris: Royal Asiatic Society, Oriental Translation Fund of Great Britain and Ireland. OCLC 5850691
 Varley, H. Paul. (1980). A Chronicle of Gods and Sovereigns: Jinnō Shōtōki of Kitabatake Chikafusa. New York: Columbia University Press. ;  OCLC 6042764

External links
 National Diet Library, "The Japanese Calendar" -- historical overview plus illustrative images from library's collection

 

Japanese eras
1310s in Japan
1320s in Japan